White Bird may refer to:

Music and entertainment
 "White Bird" (song), a 1969 song by the San Francisco band It's a Beautiful Day from the album It's a Beautiful Day
 "White Bird", a 1969 song by the Incredible String Band on their album Changing Horses
 "White Bird", a 1983 episode of the American television series Knight Rider
 White Bird: A Wonder Story, an upcoming (2022) American film

Other
 White Bird (Native American leader) (died 1892), Nez Perce leader
 White Bird, Idaho, a town in the United States
 The White Bird, a French biplane which disappeared while attempting a transatlantic crossing in 1927
 White Bird Hill Summit, a mountain grade and mountain pass on U.S. Highway 95 in North Central Idaho

See also
 
 Whitbread (disambiguation)